Erin Gee may refer to:
 Erin Gee (composer)
 Erin Gee (artist)